The Belgian women's national ice hockey team represents Belgium at the International Ice Hockey Federation's IIHF World Women's Championships. The women's national team is controlled by Royal Belgian Ice Hockey Federation. As of 2011, Belgium has 83 female players. The Belgian women's national team is ranked 27th in the world.

World Championships record
In 2000 the Belgian team was the first time involved in the World Championship competition.

2000 – Finished in 20th place
2001 – Finished in 22nd place
2003 – Finished in 23rd place (3rd in Division III)
2004 – Finished in 25th place (4th in Division III)
2005 – Finished in 23rd place (3rd in Division III)
2007 – Finished in 24th place (3rd in Division III)
2008 – Finished in 25th place (4th in Division III)
2009 – Division III canceled
2011 – Finished in 25th place (6th in Division IIA, Relegated to Division IIB)
2012 – Finished in 31st place (5th in Division IIB)
2013 – Finished in 31st place (5th in Division IIB)
2014 – Finished in 31st place (5th in Division IIB)
2015 – Finished in 32nd place (6th in Division IIB, Relegated to Division IIB Qualification)
2017 – Finished in 34th place (2nd in Division IIB Qualification)
2018 – Finished in 35th place (2nd in Division IIB Qualification)
2019 – Finished in 36th place (2nd in Division IIB Qualification)
2020 – Finished in 36th place (2nd in Division III)
2021 – Cancelled due to the COVID-19 pandemic
2022 – Finished in 32nd place (1st in Division IIIA, Promoted to Division IIB)
2023 – Finished in 29th place (1st in Division IIB, Promoted to Division IIA)

All-time record against other nations
As of 14 September 2011

References

External links

IIHF profile
National Teams of Ice Hockey

Belgian Ice Hockey Federation
Women's national ice hockey teams in Europe